Nowshera District is a district in Peshawar Division of Khyber Pakhtunkhwa province in Pakistan. The capital and district headquarter is Nowshera city.

Overview and history
Nowshera was a tehsil (sub division) of Peshawar until 1988, when it became a district. It is bordered by Peshawar District to the West, Mardan District to the North, Charsadda District to the North West, Swabi District to the North East, Kohat District to the South, Orakzai Agency to the South West & Attock District to the East.

Previously it was known as Nowkhaar Province till it was annexed into British India via the Durand Line Agreement. Prior to its establishment as a separate district in 1990, Nowshera was part of Peshawar District. The district was also part of the Peshawar Division until the reforms of The Government of Pakistan.

Total area of Nowshera is 1,748 km². The population density is 608 persons per square kilometre. The total agricultural area is 52,540 hectares. The main source of income of the region is agriculture.

Demographics 

At the time of the 2017 census the district had a population of 1,520,995, of which 783,035 were males and 737,834 females. Rural population was 1,181,460 (77.68%) while the urban population was 339,535 (22.32%). The literacy rate was 58.21% - the male literacy rate was 72.80% while the female literacy rate was 42.73%. 7,096 are from religious minorities, mainly Christians

The population of the district over the years is shown in the table below.

Languages 
At the time of the 2017 census, 92.82% of the population spoke Pashto, 3.06% Hindko, 2.04% Punjabi and 1.15% Urdu as their first language.

Education 
Nowshera district is home of many excellent education institutions. The district has a public sector University of Technology, Nowshera  and private sector Northern University, Nowshera. It also houses the campus of Abdul Wali Khan University Mardan in Pabbi town while it has a campus of University of Engineering and Technology Peshawar in Jalozai town. The district also has a public sector medical college: Nowshera Medical College, Nowshera.

It is also home to many degree colleges: Government Post Graduate College Nowshera, Government Home Economics College Nowshera, Government College Akbarpura, Government Degree College Pabbi and Government Girls Degree College Pabbi.

According to the Alif Ailaan Pakistan District Education Rankings 2017, Nowshera district is ranked 71 out of 155 districts in Pakistan in the quality of education while for facilities and infrastructure, the district is ranked 14 out of 155. It is vast improvement from Rankings of 2016, when the quality of education ranking was 71 out of 151 while facilities and infrastructure, the district was ranked 42 out of 151.

Administration and politics
The district is administratively divided into 3 Tehsils.
 Nowshera Tehsil
 Jehangira Tehsil
 Pabbi Tehsil

Union councils 
The district is divided into 47 Union Councils. The largest by area is Nizampur & the smallest by area is Pabbi.

 Nowshera
 Chowki Town
 Tarkha
 Pabbi
 Dagi Banda
 Akbarpura
 Chowkai
 Taru Jabba
 Mohib Banda
 Aman Kot
 Kurvi
 Dag Behsud
 Dag Ismail Khel
 Saleh Khana
 Shah Kot
 Nizampur
 Kheshgi Bala
 Kheshgi Payan
 Aza Khel
 Pir Piai
 Ganderhi
 Rashakai
 Risalpur
 Gandaree
 Amangarh
 Manki Sharif
 Pahari Kati Khel
 Kahi
 Ziarat Kaka Sahib
 Badrashi
 Pir Sabaq
 Zaramiana
 Misri banda
 Mughalki (Nandrak)
 Jehangira
 Akora Khattak
 Mera Akora Khattak
 Shaidu
 Adamzai
 Chasmai
 Inzari
 Mandoori
 Khairabad
 Nawan Killi

Towns and villages
The main towns in Nowshera District are Nowshera city (Capital), Badrashi, Pabbi, Jalozai, Akora Khattak, Jehangira, Risalpur, Khairabad and Nizampur. The main villages are below.

 Ziarat Kaka sahib
 Durran
 Khawrai
 Kheshgi Bala
 Kheshgi Payan   
 Dag Behsud
 Chowki Drab
 Dagi Jadeed
 Dagi Qadeem
 Banda Nabi
 Shaidu
 Azakhel Bala
 Azakhel Payan
 Rashakai
 Pirpiai
 Misri banda
 Pir Sabaq
 Taru Jabba
 Kurvi
 Dak Ismail Khel
 Chapri
 Saleh Khana
 Jabba Khattak
 Kotli Kalan
 Shah Kot
 spin kana kalan
 Jalozai
 Speen Khak
 Jaroba
 Mughalki 
 pushtoon ghari
 Dheri Kati Khel
 Palosi Payan
 Palosi Bala
 Meraji

Cantonments
These cantonments were created by the British Raj. There are three cantonments in Nowshera District:

Nowshera Cantonment
Cherat Cantonment
Risalpur Cantonment

Provincial and National Assembly seats
The district has 5 Provincial Seats in The Khyber-Pakhtunkhwa Assembly.

Provincial Assembly 

The district has 2 National Assembly Seats in The National Assembly of Pakistan.

Since 2002: NA-5 (Nowshera-I)

Since 2002: NA-6 (Nowshera-II)

The District is currently represented by Pakistan Tehreek-e-Insaaf who won all 7 Seats in the recent elections.

Geography
The following are the rivers which flow through the Nowshera District.

Bara River
Kabul River
 Kal Pani River

Some of the most famous parks are as follows:
Kund Park
Mangloot Wildlife Park
Aza Khel Park
Jinnah Park
Cherat Chapri Wildlife Park

After the launch of CPEC project, Rashakai village of Nowshera is now an Economic Zone of KPK.

Highways and motorways
N-5 National Highway
N-45 National Highway (Nowshera-Chitral)
M1 Motorway
Swat Motorway

Military history

Military installations 
Pakistan Air Force Academy Risalpur Cantt
Armoured Corps Centre Nowshera Cantt
ASC School Nowshera Cantt
School of Artillery Nowshera Cantt
School of Armour and Mechanized Warfare
Special Operations School Chirat Cantt
Military College of Engineering (NUST) Risalpur Cantt
ASC Center Nowshera Cantt
College of Aeronautical Engineering PAF Academy Asghar Khan

Buildings and institutions
Notable buildings
Darul Uloom Haqqania
Taj Building
Khushal Khan Khattak Library, Akora Khattak

Hospitals/medical facilities
Qazi Hussain Ahmed Medical Complex – Nowshera City
District Headquarters Hospital – Nowshera City
LRBT Eye Hospital Akora Khattak – Nowshera City
Combined Military Hospital – Nowshera Cantonment
Combined Military Hospital – Risalpur Cantonment
Cantt General Hospital Nowshera Cantt.
 A number of Rural Health Centers RHCs and Basi Health Units BHUs all over the district

Shrines
Nowshera District is the home of many Sufi shrines.

Shrine of Kastir Gul (Kaka Sahib)
The shrine of 16th century’s most popular Sufi saint Sayyid Kastir Gul alias Hazrat Kaka Sahib is located in a rugged mountainous area around 12 km south of Nowshera district. It is considered one of the most frequently visited religious heritage sites in Khyber Pakhtunkhwa. Born on the first of Ramazan in 1576, Kaka Sahib had received religious education from his Sufi father, Hazrat Sheikh Syed Bahadur Baba, and few Islamic scholars of his time. He used to practice all four Sufi orders – Naqshbandia, Suharwardia, Chistia and Qadria. Kaka Sahib also fondly called as Ziaree Kaka used to deliver lessons to his devotees.

Shrine of Sheikh Syed Nadir Shah (Mast Baba)
The shrine of Syed Nadir Shah (Mast Baba)
He was the father of Syed Sheikh Bahadur Baba (Abbak Sahib) and grand father of Syed Kasteer Gul (Kaka Sahib). He died on (02 Safar 969 Hijri) 1561-62 AD.

Shrine of Sheikh Bahadur Baba (Abbak Sahib)
The shrine of Sheikh Bahadur Baba is named after Sheikh Bahadur Baba. He was born at Khawara Village Khatak territory, on (15 Ramadan 941 Hijri) 1524 AD. After a life of full struggle for the prosperity of Islam and spreading of spiritual light in the region, he died on (14 Shaban 1027 Hijri)1627 Ad.
He married once and had four Sons one died as an infant, and the remaining three are Syed Sheikh Afan Sahib and Syed Sheikh Hayat Sahib(Alias Sheikh Attaan Sahib) Syed Sheikh Kasteer Gul (Sheikh Rahamkar, Kaka Sahib). His descendants are known as Abbak Kheil and Kakakheil scattered all over Kpk province. The Shrine is located near(1.5KM) the village of Kana Khel.

Maslak Bahadur Baba 
Bahadur Baba was follower of his father Mast Baba's maslak in Chishtiyyah and Suharwardiyah orders.

Bahadur Baba's famous followers
Main Wali Sahib, Main Shadi Sahib, sheikh Afan sahib, Sheikh Syed Kasteer Gul Sahib(Kaka Sahib), Akhund Mian Dad, Akhund Shareef Bali, Sheikh Allah Dad Khatak, Sheikh Nask, Faqeer Malik Meer.

Shrine of Akhund Panju Baba 
The shrine of Akhund Pangu Baba is named after Syed Abdul Wahab commonly known as Akhund Panju Baba and Baba Sahib. It is located in Akbarpura town in Pabbi Tehsil of Nowshera. The shrine was attacked by Taliban militants in 2011 killing 11 people.

Shrine of Sheikh Baba 
The shrine of Sheikh Shahbaz Baba is named after Sheikh Shahbaz Baba commonly known as Sheikh Baba .The shrine is located in Pabbi town near Grand Trunk (GT), Nowshera.

Shrine of Pir Sabaq Baba jee
The shrine of Pir sabaq baba jee named Sheikh Abdus Salam sahib commonly known as Sahib Mubarak is located in ( Pir Sabaq Sharif) 05KM from Nowshera Cantt on left side of Peshawar-Pindi GT road (after crossing Kabul river at Pirsabaq bridge 1.5KM).

Notable people 
A list of some of the most prominent people from Nowshera District: 
 Abdul Haq Daarul uloom Haqqania
 Ajmal Khattak - President ANP
 John Ormsby Evelyn Vandeleur - brigadier general, WWII British Army Commander XXX Corps during Operation Market Garden
 Alam Khattak, lieutenant general
 Gul Hassan Khan - Commander in Chief
 Sardar Ali Haqqani - Islamic scholar
 Qazi Hussain Ahmad - Former Ameer Jamat-i-Islami Pakistan
 Naseerullah Khan Babar - Former Interior Minister
 Pervez Khattak - Chief Minister KP
 Sami ul Haq - senator
 Shamsul Mulk - caretaker chief minister
 Sher Zaman Taizi - poet and writer
 Sartaj Aziz Former federal minister
 Nasrullah Khan Khattak Ex- CM
 Zarsanga - The Queen Of Pashtun Folklore

See also

Khushal Khan Khattak
Khattak
Akora Khattak

References

Bibliography 

 
Districts of Khyber Pakhtunkhwa